Washiya Mohamed is a Maldivian film actress.

Early life
After completing nursey education at Maafannu Madharusa, Mohamed joined Ghiyasuddin International School, where she took part in several stage dramas which accelerated her interest in working in the film industry. While studying in grade 6, she performed the role of a male sorcerer in one of such stage shows, which she credited as an "eye-opening performance" for her with regard to "method acting". She continued performing several other theatrical stage shows while pursuing high school education in MAPS International High.

Career
Mohamed made her career debut by playing one of the main roles in Mohamed Munthasir's sitcom web series, Thin Bibee (2019). When initially offered the project by her friend, Nathasha Jaleel who co-stars in the series, she rejected the role citing "lack of confidence" to work on-screen. However, she was re-offered the role by Munthasir while she was shooting for an advertisement, and she agrees to "give it a try" for a start. The series was released through a newly launched digital streaming platform Baiskoafu and the feedback to the series was minimal. She next hosted VTV's The Baiskoafu Show directed by Naaisha Nashid. This was also her segue to Ahmed Iqbal's Ehenas, who was impressed by her skill, and developed a new character, Pink, non-existent in his novel and offered to play the role in Ravee Farooq-directed web series Ehenas which "exposed her acting ability". Following the experiences of a long-term domestic and sexually abused male victim and how he faces the societal obstacles of marriage, Mohamed played the role of an independent woman and a supportive friend, which was well received by critics.

Apart from playing a small role in Moomin Fuad's period drama web television series Gamini, she was a part of the ensemble cast of Yoosuf Shafeeu's romantic comedy web-series Huvaa Kohfa Bunan, where she played the sister of a politician and a domestically abused girlfriend. The following year, she starred in Moomin Fuad's crime drama short film Feehaali, where her rebellious character and the film got positive reviews from critics.

Filmography

Feature film

Television

Short film

References

External links
 

Living people
People from Malé
21st-century Maldivian actresses
Maldivian film actresses
Year of birth missing (living people)